Simply Awful! is a 1982 Soviet fantasy comedy film directed by Aleksandr Polynnikov based on the play of the same name by Yuri Sotnik. It is the second adaptation of the play, the first one was Two Days of Miracles in 1970.

Plot
The film tells about the adventures of sixth grader Anton Murashov and his father, who are both convinced that it would be very easy to be a completely different person and do other tasks, perhaps even easier than being yourself. Father of Anton's friend invents the "Wish-fulfiller" and with the help of this machine Anton and Vadim Petrovich exchange places - Anton becomes a veterinarian, and his veterinarian father, a schoolboy.

Cast
Dima Zamulin — Anton Murashov
Semyon Morozov — Vadim Petrovich
Anna Tolstaya — Alenka
Galina Venevitinova — Marousia
Alla Budnitskaya — Varvara Ivanovna
Leonid Kuravlyov — Ruslan Ivanovich
Elizaveta Nikishchihina — Anna Borisovna
Yevgeniya Khanayeva — Antonina Georgievna
Aleksandr Shirvindt — Chief Physician
Lidia Ezhevskaya — Louise Vasilievna
Natalya Krachkovskaya — Raisa Nikolaevna
Sergey Golubkov — Serezha
Natalya Seleznyova — girl with a wrench
Liliya Gritsenko — teacher of geography
Herman Kachin — Leonid Nikolaevich
Vladimir Yumatov — friend of Murashov Sr.
Tamara Yarenko — teacher
Alexander Glovyak — artist
Natalya Kustinskaya — cat lady
Vladimir Naumtsev — teacher of mathematics
Elena Fetisenko — landlady
Georgiy Georgiou — neighbor of the Murashovs
Alexander Vasyushkin — cameo
Yevgeny Morgunov — owner of the goat
Valery Nosik — hunter

References

External links

Soviet fantasy comedy films
1980s fantasy comedy films
Russian children's fantasy films
Odesa Film Studio films
1980s children's fantasy films
Films about wish fulfillment
1982 comedy films
1982 films
Body swapping in films
Soviet television films
Films based on Russian novels
Soviet children's films